The 1st Newcastle upon Tyne Artillery Volunteer Corps was a unit of the Volunteer Force raised to supplement the British Army at a time of a perceived French threat in 1860.

History
The unit was formed on the 2 June 1860 during the great surge of enthusiasm after an invasion scare that saw the creation of many Rifle, Artillery and Engineer Volunteer units composed of part-time soldiers eager to supplement the Regular British Army in time of need.

Attached to the 1st Newcastle AVC were the 1st Berwick-on-Tweed Artillery Volunteers from 1863 until 1866. In addition the 2nd Northumberland Artillery Volunteers were attached during 1863 and 1864 and the 3rd Durham Artillery Volunteers from 1873 until 1890.

In 1899 the Headquarters for the Corps was built. Named as the Angus Hall Drill Hall, it was constructed at Liddell Terrace, Gateshead.

On transfer to the Territorial Force in 1908 the Corps provided the 5th (Durham) Howitzer Battery of the 4th Northumbrian (County of Durham)(H) Brigade, Royal Field Artillery.

Honorary Colonel
The Honorary Colonel from January 1866 until his death in 1877 was Lord Henry H M Percy VC. From 1885 it was Colonel J R Young.

Notes

References
 Ian F.W. Beckett, Riflemen Form: A study of the Rifle Volunteer Movement 1859–1908, Aldershot: Ogilby Trusts, 1982, .
 Litchfield, Norman E H, and Westlake, R, 1982. The Volunteer Artillery 1859-1908, The Sherwood Press, Nottingham.

Online sources
 British History Online
 Land Forces of Britain, the Empire and Commonwealth (Regiments.org)

Military units and formations in Northumberland
Newcastle
Military units and formations established in 1860
Military units and formations disestablished in 1908